The Bluebells are a Scottish indie new wave band, active between 1981 and 1986 (later briefly reforming in 1993, 2008–2009, 2011 and 2018).

Career
The Bluebells performed jangly guitar-based pop not dissimilar to their Scottish contemporaries Aztec Camera and Orange Juice. They had three top 40 hits on the UK Singles Chart, all written by guitarist and founder member Bobby Bluebell (real name Robert Hodgens) – "I'm Falling", "Cath", and their biggest success "Young at Heart".  The latter was co-written with Siobhan Fahey of Bananarama (originally recorded on the Bananarama album Deep Sea Skiving) and violinist Bobby Valentino, and made it to number 8 on the UK Singles Chart on its original release in 1984. The band also released one EP, The Bluebells, and one full-length album, Sisters.
 
The band split up in the mid-1980s, but enjoyed an unexpected revival in 1993 when "Young at Heart" was used in a Volkswagen television advertisement. Re-issued as a single, it was number one for four weeks and led to the band reforming temporarily to perform the song on BBC Television's Top of the Pops. A compilation album followed, The Singles Collection, which peaked at No. 27 on the UK Albums Chart in April 1993.

The band reformed in late 2008, with original members the McCluskey brothers and Bobby Bluebell, to support Edwyn Collins at a show in Glasgow on 23 January 2009. On 29 May 2011, the band performed as part of the Southside Festival. On 17 December 2018, the band performed on a Christmas edition of The Quay Sessions for BBC Scotland. In 2019, the Bluebells appeared performing "Young at Heart" in an episode of the last series of the BBC Scotland sitcom Still Game.

Post Bluebells
Prior to achieving chart success, bass player Lawrence Donegan left the band to join Lloyd Cole and the Commotions and then later trained as a journalist and is now a golf correspondent for The Guardian, having previously worked at The Scotsman. The other members of the band stayed in the music business after the split – David McCluskey and his brother, Ken, formed a folk duo.  Ken also works as a lecturer at Glasgow Kelvin College teaching music business, and David uses music therapeutically with a wide variety of people. Robert Hodgens has worked as a professional songwriter and formed a new group called The Poems, signed to the American label Minty Fresh.

Band members
 Bobby Bluebell (born Robert Anthony Hodgens, 6 June 1957, Scotland) – guitar
 David McCluskey (born 13 January 1964, Hamilton, Scotland) – drums
 Ken McCluskey (born Kenneth McCluskey, 8 February 1962, Hamilton, Scotland) – vocals / harmonica
 Lawrence Donegan (born 13 July 1961, Stirling, Scotland) – bass
 Craig Gannon (born Craig Ian Gannon, 30 July 1966, Manchester, England) – guitar
 Neil Baldwin  (born Neil Edward Baldwin) – bass
 Russell Irvine (born 28 March 1962, Johnstone, Scotland)– guitar
 Gary Crowley - guitar

Discography

Albums

Singles

References

External links
 [ The Bluebells at AllMusic]

London Records artists
Musical groups established in 1981
Scottish new wave musical groups
Jangle pop groups
British indie pop groups
Sire Records artists